Ruby Moonstone Camilla Willow Fee (born February 7, 1996) is a German-Costa Rican actress.

Early Life 
Fee was born in Costa Rica to a German mother. She soon moved to Brazil, where she spent much of her childhood. In 2008, the family moved to Berlin, Germany. She was enrolled at Béla Bartók Music School.

Career 
In 2010, she became known for her leading role as Sophie Kellermann in the television series Allein gegen die Zeit. She was also hired again for the second season of the series, which was filmed in 2010/2011. In her first feature film, Womb (2010), she played the teenage Rebecca (played as an adult by Eva Green). In the feature film Dandelion – The Cinematic Adventure, which was shot in the summer of 2010 and was released in May 2011, she also received a leading role as Laila. 

In the summer of 2012, the shooting of a film adaptation of the children's book Die schwarzen Brüder with Moritz Bleibtreu took place, in which Ruby O. Fee took over the role of Angeletta. She then got the role in the TV movie Lotta & the Happy Future, in which she played a sick girl who has heartache. She received a lot of praise for the portrayal of the murder suspect Sarah in the Tatort episode Happy Birthday, Sarah. In the summer of 2013, Fee appeared in front of the camera for Detlev Buck's film Bibi and Tina as Sophia von Gelenberg. 

In 2015 she played one of the leading roles in Andreas Dresen's film As We Were Dreaming, based on the novel of the same name by Clemens Meyer. In 2016 she played the female lead in the two-part historical film  (D/CZ). In the German psychological thriller Zazy, by Matthias X. Oberg, from 2016, she played the female lead. In the 2019 US-German action film Polar, she played a supporting role alongside Mads Mikkelsen. In Lindenberg! Mach dein Ding (2020) she plays Paula aus Sankt Pauli, immortalized in the song "Alles klar auf der Andrea Doria", by Udo Lindenberg.

In 2021 she played the role of Korina in the film Army of Thieves, directed by Matthias Schweighöfer, who also starred in the movie.

Filmography 
 2010: Womb
 2010–2012: Allein gegen die Zeit (TV series, 26 episodes)
 2011: Dandelion – The Cinema Adventure
 2013: Lotta & the Happy Future (film series)
 2013: Letzte Spur Berlin – Ewige Dunkelheit (TV series)
 2013: 
 2013: Tatort – Happy Birthday, Sarah (TV series episode)
 2013: Dead
 2014: Bibi & Tina
 2014: Kein Entkommen (TV movie)
 2014: Bibi & Tina: Fully Bewitched!
 2015: As We Were Dreaming
 2015: Ghosthunters: On Icy Trails
 2016: Rockabilly Requiem
 2016: Tatort – Kartenhaus (TV series episode)
 2016:  (TV movie)
 2016: Shakespeare's Last Round (TV movie)
 2016: Zazy
 2016: 
 2016: Crazy about Fixi
 2016: Prinz Himmelblau und Fee Lupine (TV movie)
 2017: Die Ketzerbraut (TV movie)
 2017: Hard Way: The Action Musical (short film)
 2017: Schuld nach Ferdinand von Schirach – Anatomie (TV series episode)
 2017: The Invisibles
 2018: Tatort – Der kalte Fritte (TV series episode)
 2018: Five Friends and the Valley of the Dinosaurs
 2018: Rosamunde Pilcher: Nanny Desperately Wanted (TV movie)
 2018: The Old Fox – In voller Absicht (TV series episode)
 2019: Polar
 2019: Sweethearts
 2019: Murder in the North: Healing Family (TV series episode)
 2019: Your Color
 2020: Lindenberg! Do Your Thing
 2020: SOKO Leipzig – The Trap (TV series episode)
 2020: Asphalt Burning
 2021: Army of Thieves

Awards 

 2014: Jupiter in the category Best German TV Actress for Tatort: Happy Birthday, Sarah
 2014: Golden Sparrow in the category Best Actor for The Black Brothers
 2014: Günter-Strack-Fernsehpreis for Tatort: Happy Birthday, Sarah
 2016: Immenhof Film Award 2015 in the category Best Actress

References

External links 

 

Living people
1996 births
German actresses